The Beatles Collection is a box set of the Beatles' vinyl albums released in the United States in November 1978 and the following month in the United Kingdom. It contains the official catalogue of the Beatles in stereo, and a new compilation called Rarities.

The American issue by Capitol Records contained the British pressings of the same 12 original albums, with the American pressing of Rarities. The latter differed from its British counterpart in that it included the previously released English-language versions of "She Loves You" and "I Want to Hold Your Hand", rather than the German-language version found on the British Rarities compilation. The American edition of the box set was a limited edition of only 3000 numbered copies. The limited availability of the American release resulted in the British release becoming popular as an import into the US.

There is also a rare EMI New Zealand version which combines the British box with some elements of the American version, such as the US custom liner on a gatefold Rarities.

Contents
The Beatles Collection did not include a number of Beatles recordings, including those released on the Magical Mystery Tour album. This album had been released in the United States in 1967, but it was not counted among the group's official catalogue because it was not issued in the United Kingdom until 1976. The collection also omitted the non-album singles that had previously been released in 1973 on the twin compilation packages 1962–1966 and 1967–1970.

The collection also includes the inserts contained in the individual albums, such as the cardboard cutout sheet in Sgt. Pepper's Lonely Hearts Club Band and the photos and poster in The Beatles.

A company specialising in audiophile vinyl pressings, Mobile Fidelity Sound Lab, released a similar box set in 1982 called The Beatles: The Collection. This set consisted of the 12 British albums – Rarities was not included, but Magical Mystery Tour was – pressed off the original Abbey Road studio master tapes (except for MMT), using a technique called "Half Speed Mastering", and onto Japanese "virgin" vinyl. The set was highly acclaimed for its sonic accuracy and only approximately 25,000 were released. In this case, the actual covers for each album was a photo of a studio master tape, along with the engineer's log sheet. The original album covers were compiled in an LP-size booklet.

Album listing

See also 
The Beatles Box
The Beatles: The Collection
The Beatles Mono Collection
The Beatles Box Set
The Beatles (The Original Studio Recordings)
The Beatles in Mono
The U.S. Albums

References

1978 compilation albums
The Beatles compilation albums
Parlophone compilation albums
Capitol Records compilation albums
Albums produced by George Martin
Albums produced by Phil Spector
Albums arranged by George Martin
Albums conducted by George Martin
Albums arranged by George Harrison
Albums conducted by George Harrison
Albums arranged by Mike Leander
Albums arranged by John Lennon
Albums conducted by John Lennon
Albums arranged by Paul McCartney
Albums conducted by Paul McCartney
Reissue albums
Albums recorded at Olympic Sound Studios
Albums recorded at Trident Studios
Albums recorded at Apple Studios